150th Regiment may refer to:

 150th (Yorkshire) Transport Regiment, a unit of the United Kingdom Territorial Army
 150th Illinois Volunteer Infantry Regiment, a unit of the Union (North) Army during the American Civil War
 150th Fighter-Bomber Aviation Regiment, a unit of the Yugoslav Air Force